Darkoti State was one of the Princely states of India during the period of the British Raj. Its last ruler signed the accession to the Dominion of India on 15 April 1948. Currently, it is part of the Indian state of Himachal Pradesh.

History
According to legend the state of Darkoti was founded during the 11th century by Raja Durga Singh Kachhawa. It was occupied by the Gurkhas of Nepal from 1803 to 1815 when they were expelled by the British. After the occupation ended it became a British protectorate.

Rulers
The rulers of Darkoti bore the title 'Rana'.

Ranas
 ... - 1787               ... 
1787 - ...              Bal Ram         
 ... - 1815                Jathu Ram                  
1815 - 1854                Sutes Ram                          (d. 1854) 
1854 - 1856                Paras Ram                          (d. 1856) 
1856 - 1883                Ram Singh                          (b. 1815 - d. 1883) 
15 Oct 1883 – 24 Sep 1918  Ramsaran Singh                     (b. 1843 - d. 1918) 
24 Sep 1918 – 15 Aug 1947  Raghunath Singh                    (b. 1881 - d. 1951)

References

Princely states of India
History of Himachal Pradesh
Rajputs
11th-century establishments in India
1948 disestablishments in India